Vilde Hasund (born 27 June 1997) is a Norwegian footballer who plays as a midfielder for Hammarby IF in Damallsvenskan. In 2022 she was called up to the Norway national team.

Career 
In 2021 Hasund won the Toppserien, the highest football league in Norway. She was the tenth top scorer in the league with 6 goals in the season.

References

1997 births
Living people
People from Ulstein
Norwegian women's footballers
Norway women's youth international footballers
Norway women's international footballers
IL Hødd players
Røa IL players
Lyn Fotball Damer players
SK Brann Kvinner players
Hammarby Fotboll (women) players
Toppserien players
Damallsvenskan players
Women's association football midfielders
Sportspeople from Møre og Romsdal